The 2017 Rochester Rattlers season is the fifteenth season for the Rochester Rattlers of Major League Lacrosse. In 2016, the Rattlers were one of seven teams tied atop the standings at 8–6. However, after tiebreaker procedures, the Rattlers were one of three teams left out of the four-team postseason. Seeking revenge, the Rattlers won their last four games of the regular season, including victories over the defending champion Denver Outlaws and runners-up Ohio Machine, to clinch their third playoff spot in four years. At 8–6, the Rattlers earned the fourth seed. The Rattlers' season would come to an end on August 12 in Denver by way of a 15–8 loss to the Outlaws.

Amidst rumors that the team would be relocating to Dallas for the 2017 season, the team announced on January 19 that it would be moving back to Capelli Sport Stadium after playing one season at Aquinas Institute.

Despite drawing their best attendance since the 2012 season and making the playoffs, the team was relocated to the Dallas area and Ford Center at The Star in November 2017. The announcement was made at the Dallas Cowboys World Headquarters in Frisco, Texas.

Schedule

Regular season

Postseason

Standings

References

External links
 Team Website

Major League Lacrosse seasons
Rochester Rattlers
Rochester Rattlers